The Pennsylvania Department of Military and Veterans Affairs (DMVA) was established on April 11, 1793, by the Pennsylvania General Assembly. It is overseen by the adjutant general, a cabinet-level position appointed by the governor.

The Pennsylvania Department of Military and Veterans Affairs operates its own sworn Police Force at Fort Indiantown Gap. The Fort Indiantown Gap Installation Police enforce Pennsylvania State law and military regulations on State owned/operated property. They are required to be trained in accordance with Act 120 which is administered by the Pennsylvania Municipal Police Officers Education & Training Commission.
 
The Pennsylvania National Guard is a component of the Pennsylvania Department of Military and Veterans Affairs. The agency employs more than 2,400 commonwealth employees and approximately 19,000 Pennsylvania National Guard members in more than 90 communities across the commonwealth, ranking it as one of the state's top 10 largest employers.

In November 2015, Pennsylvania Department of Military and Veterans Affairs unveiled a new online application that allows people to donate directly to its veterans programs, including the Veterans' Trust Fund and Military Family Relief Assistance Program.

See also
List of Pennsylvania state agencies
Pennsylvania State Guard

References

1793 establishments in Pennsylvania
Department of Military and Veteran's Affairs
State departments of veterans affairs in the United States